Bearded pig may refer to:
 Bornean bearded pig, Sus barbatus, native to Sumatra, Borneo, and the Malay Peninsula
 Palawan bearded pig, Sus ahoenobarbus, native to the Philippines

Animal common name disambiguation pages